Lake Traverse is the southernmost body of water in the Hudson Bay watershed of North America.  It lies along the border between the U.S. states of Minnesota and South Dakota. A low continental divide, part of the Laurentian Divide, separates the land at the southern shore of Lake Traverse from Big Stone Lake, the headwaters of the south-flowing Little Minnesota River, which is part of the Mississippi River System. Both lakes lie within a mile of the town of Browns Valley, Minnesota with Wheaton, Minnesota (at the north end of Lake Traverse); and Ortonville, Minnesota (at the south end of Big Stone Lake).

Lake Traverse is an Anglicization of Lac Traverse, a French name meaning "across the lake".

Prehistorically, the south end of Lake Traverse was the southern outlet of glacial Lake Agassiz across the Traverse Gap into Glacial River Warren; that river carved the valley now occupied by the present-day Minnesota River.

Lake Traverse is drained at its north end by the northward-flowing Bois de Sioux River, a tributary of the Red River of the North.  A U.S. Army Corps of Engineers dam at the outflow regulates the lake's level.  The Mustinka River flows into the lake just above the dam.

See also
List of Minnesota lakes 
List of South Dakota lakes
List of lakes

External links
US Army Corps of Engineers Lake Traverse website

References

Traverse
Traverse
Borders of Minnesota
Borders of South Dakota
Traverse
Traverse